"I Saw What I Saw" is the sixth episode of the sixth season of the American television medical drama Grey's Anatomy, and the show's 108th episode overall. It was written by Peter William Harper and directed by Allison Liddi-Brown. The episode was originally broadcast on the American Broadcasting Company (ABC) in the United States on October 22, 2009.

The episode begins in medias res, depicting events following a whodunit style, exposing them from alternating points of view in a fast-paced way.  Katherine Heigl (Dr. Izzie Stevens) was absent from the episode, due to her hiatus to film the 2010 romantic comedy Life as We Know It. Upon its initial airing, the episode was viewed by 15.40 million people, garnered a 5.6/4 Nielsen rating/share in the 18–49 demographic, and ranked #1 for the night in terms of viewership and ratings.

Plot
After victims burned in a hotel fire are brought to the hospital, Seattle Grace and Mercy West residents compete to get the best cases. Unexpectedly, a woman (Cathy Becker, played by Erinn Hayes) about to be discharged dies after a medical negligence mistake committed by one of the many surgeons who treated her. Chief Webber then starts a witch hunt to trace back the culprit and identify the cause of death. Each doctor gives their point of view of the chaotic scene that happened in the ER that day: Owen, Cristina, Bailey, Alex, Callie, Lexie, Charles, Jackson, April and Reed. The case of the patient then starts to be reconstructed. Her deep second degree burning, her chest pain, her pneumothorax and the cricothyrotomy Alex had to perform on her are exposed, as well as several other parallel storylines and medical cases linked to the fire.

Reed ultimately realizes that the mistake was committed by April, who forgot to check the patient's airways, already swelled by the smoke, after being distracted by a patient with an axe stuck in his chest. Richard then fires her. The residents are shown having various reactions, as some complain about the absurdity of April's mistake, while Cristina shows empathy for her former enemy. Derek then criticizes Richard, telling him he was initially responsible for the situation by setting chaos in the ER with the merger.

A subplotline of the episode includes Alex desperately seeking Izzie and calling her frequently to convince her to come back, even threatening to file a missing person report.

Production

The episode was written by William Harper and directed by Allison Liddi-Brown. David Greenspan edited the episode and Donald Lee Harris served as production designer. Featured music included [...].

Reception
The episode received positive reviews among television critics, and it outperformed the previous episode in terms of viewership. "I Saw What I Saw" was originally broadcast on October 22, 2009, in the United States on the American Broadcasting Company (ABC). The episode was viewed by a total of 15.40 million people, up 1.61% from the previous episode "Invasion", which garnered 13.79 million viewers. In terms of viewership, "I Saw What I Saw" ranked #1 for the night, beating out CBS's Survivor, The Mentalist, and CSI: Crime Scene Investigation. In addition to placing at the top of the night for viewership, its 5.6/14 Nielsen rating ranked #1 in its 9:00 Eastern time-slot and the entire night, for both the rating and share percentages of the key 18–49 demographic, beating out Survivor, NBC's The Office and 30 Rock, and ABC's Flash Forward. In comparison to the previous episode's rating, "I Saw What I Saw" showed an increase, with the former garnering a 5.0/13 rating share in the 18–49 demographic.

BuddyTV gave a positive review saying, "Notice how good Grey‘s Anatomy gets when it focuses on the medicine and ignores people‘s drama?" That, in a nutshell, is what happened to Seattle Grace following the so-called invasion last week. It was an awesome episode. Flashbacks are made of win, especially when you sort of know the ending, and everything feels like a gradual build-up to it."

The review posted on TV Squad gave a mixed review, "There was a lot of potential that this episode could have gone with.[...] The thing about what made [...] the Grey's episode poor was the fact that in Grey's all perspectives were the same." A review posted on TVFanatic  says:"The question is whether it worked. We're going to go with a definitive yes ... and no."

References

External links
"I Saw What I Saw" at ABC.com

2009 American television episodes
Grey's Anatomy (season 6) episodes